National Unity was a right-wing Greek political party founded in April 2016 by LAOS leader Giorgos Karatzaferis and the former cabinet secretary and Samaras aide, .

References

Political parties in Greece
Political parties established in 2016
2016 establishments in Greece
Right-wing parties in Europe

Political parties disestablished in 2016